The 2017 UCI Women's World Tour was the second edition of the UCI Women's World Tour. For the 2017 season, the calendar consisted of 20 races, up from 17 in 2016. Two one-day races – the Amstel Gold Race and Liège–Bastogne–Liège, to complete an Ardennes classics week – were added along with the Ladies Tour of Norway and the Holland Ladies Tour; all 2016 races returned for the 2017 calendar, with the exception of the cancelled Philadelphia International Cycling Classic.

The individual classification was won by Dutch rider Anna van der Breggen, riding for the  team. Van der Breggen took the lead of the standings after winning the Tour of California, and after losing the lead to Poland's Katarzyna Niewiadoma after the Women's Tour, van der Breggen regained the lead after victory at the Giro d'Italia Femminile. Van der Breggen, who won five races during 2017 – including all three Ardennes classics – maintained her lead throughout the remainder of the season, ultimately winning the overall classification by 27 points from compatriot Annemiek van Vleuten from the  team. Van Vleuten closed the gap in points over the second half of the season, finishing third at the Giro d'Italia Femminile before victories at La Course by Le Tour de France, and the Holland Ladies Tour. Third place in the standings went to Niewiadoma, who took podium finishes in all three Ardennes classics and a second place at Strade Bianche, alongside her Women's Tour victory.

In the other classifications,  rider Cecilie Uttrup Ludwig from Denmark was the winner of the youth classification for riders under the age of 23. Uttrup Ludwig took seven victories in the classification, and finished with over three times as many points compared to her nearest challengers.  were the winners of the teams classification, taking eight wins during the season. , and their American rider Coryn Rivera, took three victories as they finished as runners-up in the standings.

Teams

Key

Events
The Philadelphia International Cycling Classic was scheduled to be held on 4 June, but was cancelled on 27 January due to "difficulty attracting sponsor financial support".

Final points standings

Individual

Riders tied with the same number of points were classified by number of victories, then number of second places, third places, and so on, in World Tour events and stages.

Youth

The top three riders in the final results of each World Tour event's young rider classification received points towards the standings. Six points were awarded to first place, four points to second place and two points to third place.

Team

Team rankings were calculated by adding the ranking points of the top four riders of a team in each race, plus points gained in the Crescent Vårgårda UCI Women's WorldTour TTT.

Notes

References

 
2017 in women's road cycling
UCI Women's World Tour